Mario Czaja (born 21 September 1975) is a German politician of the Christian Democratic Union (CDU) who has been serving as the party's Secretary General since 31 January 2022, under the leadership of Friedrich Merz. He is a member of the German Bundestag since the 2021 elections. From 2006 until 2021, he was a member of the State Parliament of Berlin.

Early life and career 
Czaja was born 1975 in East Berlin, the capital of East Germany, and studied business administration. From 1997 until 2000, he worked at insurance company Nürnberger Versicherung.

Political career

Career in state politics 
Czaja entered the CDU in 1993 and became member of the State Parliament of Berlin in the 1999 state elections. He served as his parliamentary group's spokesperson on health policy from 2001 until 2011.

From 2011 to 2016 Czaja was also member of the Senate of Berlin, the government body of Berlin, with responsibility for health care and social issues. At the time, he was the youngest member of the state government led by Governing Mayor Michael Müller. In 2012, Czaja – together fellow state ministers Frank Henkel and Thomas Heilmann – unsuccessfully advocated for a reduction in the penalty-free personal use of cannabis from 15 to six grams.

Also during his time in office, Czaja appointed former state government members Eberhard Diepgen, Heidi Knake-Werner, Ingrid Stahmer and Wolfgang Wieland as advisors on the city's migration policies in 2014. In 2016, Czaja cancelled the government's contract with one of the city's largest operators of hostels for asylum seekers after newspapers B.Z. and Bild printed internal emails showing the company's managers joking about building a guillotine and crematorium for refugee children.

Czaja was a CDU delegate to the Federal Convention for the purpose of electing the President of Germany in 2017.

From 2018 until 2021, Czaja served as his parliamentary group's deputy chair, under the leadership of Burkard Dregger. During that time, he was also a member of the Committee on Education, Youth and Families.

Member of the German Parliament, 2021–present 
Czaja won the Berlin-Marzahn-Hellersdorf district in the 2021 German federal election – a seat held by members of the PDS or The Left since the 1990 German federal election (the first to be held in East Berlin).

Ahead of the Christian Democrats' leadership election in 2022, Czaja publicly endorsed Friedrich Merz to succeed Laschet as the party's chair and joined his campaign team.

Other activities

Corporate boards 
 Vivantes Hospital Group, Ex-Officio Member of the supervisory board (2011–2016)

Non-profit organizations 
 German Red Cross (DRK) – Berlin Chapter, President
 German Heart Center, Ex-Officio Member of the council (2011–2016)
 1. FC Union Berlin, Member

Political positions 
Within the CDU, Czaja is considered an ally of Jens Spahn. When the CDU/CSU entered into a coalition government with the center-left Social Democratic Party (SPD) on the national level following the 2013 elections, he joined a group of young party members – including Günter Krings, Michael Kretschmer and Spahn – in signing an open letter which called for changes in the CDU's policies and leadership. For the 2021 national elections, he joined Spahn in endorsing Armin Laschet as the Christian Democrats' joint candidate to succeed Chancellor Angela Merkel.

Also in 2021, Czaja publicly criticized the chairman of the CDU in Berlin, Kai Wegner, as being too right-wing, arguing that he was "closer to Hans-Georg Maaßen than Angela Merkel and Armin Laschet."

Controversy 
In 1997, a court ordered Czaja – who was 21 years old at the time – to pay a fine of 2,000 Deutsche Mark for desertion after he had twice failed to report for duty in the German Armed Forces. The prosecution had originally demanded a suspended sentence of four months.

Personal life 
Czaja has been married to Julia Marx since 2012. They have one daughter.

References

External links

1975 births
Living people
People from East Berlin
Christian Democratic Union of Germany politicians
20th-century German politicians
21st-century German politicians
Members of the Abgeordnetenhaus of Berlin
Members of the Bundestag 2021–2025